The Bioko forest shrew or Isabella's shrew (Sylvisorex isabellae) is a species of mammal in the family Soricidae found in Cameroon and Equatorial Guinea. Its natural habitats are subtropical or tropical moist montane forest and subtropical or tropical high-elevation grassland.

References

Sylvisorex
Taxonomy articles created by Polbot
Mammals described in 1968
Fauna of Bioko